Pieridis Museum is a museum in Athens, Greece. Its collection includes items dating back almost nine thousand years, from the neolithic period to the Middle Ages. They are a part of the archaeological collection of the Pierides Museum in Larnaca, Cyprus. It is situated in the Athinais Culture Center in Votanikos, about 2 km west of downtown Athens.

External links
City of Athens (Greek only)
 Information on the Athens Info Guide

Archaeological museums in Athens
Year of establishment unknown